The following lists events that happened during 1985 in Cambodia.

Incumbents 
 Head of state: Heng Samrin 
 Prime Minister: vacant (until January 14), Hun Sen (starting January 14)

Events

January
January 14 – Hun Sen is confirmed as prime minister, having been acting PM since the death of his predecessor Chan Sy.

February

March

April

May

June

July

August

September

October

November

December

References

 
Years of the 20th century in Cambodia
Cambodia
1980s in Cambodia
Cambodia